Perry Township may refer to the following townships in the U.S. state of Iowa:

 Perry Township, Buchanan County, Iowa
 Perry Township, Davis County, Iowa
 Perry Township, Jackson County, Iowa
 Perry Township, Plymouth County, Iowa
 Perry Township, Tama County, Iowa

See also

Perry Township (disambiguation)

Iowa township disambiguation pages